The El Sharara oil field is an oil field located in Murzuq Desert. It was discovered in 1980 and developed by Petrom. The oil field is operated and owned by Repsol.

References 

Oil fields of Libya